Coleophora amarchana is a moth of the family Coleophoridae. It is found in southern Russia and Mongolia.

Adults are on wing in August.

References

amarchana
Moths described in 1975
Moths of Asia